The Men's elimination race  was held on 17 October 2015.

Results

References

Men's elimination race
European Track Championships – Men's elimination race